Guy X is a 2005 black comedy war film directed by Saul Metzstein, based on the novel No One Thinks Of Greenland by John Griesemer. The movie stars Jason Biggs, Natascha McElhone, Jeremy Northam, and Michael Ironside.

Plot
It is 1979, four years after the end of US involvement in the Vietnam War.  US Army Corporal Rudy Spruance is mistakenly sent to Qangattarsa, a remote base in Greenland still attributed to the United States Army Air Forces (despite that service being converted to the United States Air Force in 1947), instead of his official posting in Hawaii. He soon finds out that his records have accidentally been replaced by the records of a Corporal Martin Pederson, who has been sent to Hawaii.

The base is occupied by a co-ed battalion of US Army misfits, many of whom have been stationed there for over five years, doing little more than drink and sex their way through the overwhelming boredom.  The only apparent military duty is to unload and reload a supply plane every couple of months. The base has been commanded for many years by the near-insane Lt. Col. L. G. Woolwrap, supported by his Aide of three years, SFC Irene Teal, his erstwhile girlfriend. Teal points out that it does not make much difference who he really is, nor where he is based, as it all just functions as service time.

Working under the name Pederson, as the base's new Public Information Officer, Spruance starts an intimate and personal relationship with Teal.  While exploring he finds out that underneath the base is a secret and highly classified hospital ward.  The ward houses the last six surviving, unnamed (other than letters, including W, X, Y, Z), brain dead and very physically damaged soldiers from a secret Vietnam War mission in October 1973.  When Spruance/Pederson stumbles upon the ward, he develops a rapport with "Guy X", who has lucid moments that no one else knows about.  Spruance sleuths out that then-Col. Woolwrap had been the leader of the mission, and has been in command of the palliative care base ever since – having signed the letters to the families of the ward patients stating that they had died in combat and that their bodies were irretrievable. On one of his clandestine visits to the ward, Spruance meets an unnamed plainclothes operative from the Department of the Army, who confirms that the soldiers are "classified loose ends, and exercise in patience", as they wait for them to die.

Guy X dictates a letter to Spruance, for the wife of one of his men.  Spruance sneaks the letter out on the next supply plane. The letter has an impact as some weeks later, at the height of the 24 hour darkness of the winter solstice, the Army orders a sudden and rapid shutdown of the base due to "compromised security". The same mysterious operative appears, telling Spruance by name (as they have clarified his identity) that the remaining "Guys" will be disposed of (in an undescribed way).  Spruance and Teal find Guy X under his bed in the otherwise abandoned ward, and answer his request to see the outside world before he dies. Just as Guy X dies in the snow, Woolwrap finds them and tells Spruance and Teal that he will not abandon his men, killing himself with his sidearm.  The two just make it to the last evacuation plane, where his friend Cpl Lavone informs them that he has created official paperwork giving them new names and ranks (similar to the original Spruance/Pederson mixup). As the plane flies away from Greenland, "General" Lavone asks the small group which base, in which (warm) country, they wish to have designated in their "new" orders.

Reception

The film has received a rating of 36% on review aggregate website Rotten Tomatoes based on eleven reviews.

Cast
 Jason Biggs as Corporal Rudy Spruance / Corporal Martin Pederson, Public Information Officer
 Natascha McElhone as SFC Irene Teal, Lieutenant Colonel Woolwrap's Aide
 Jeremy Northam as Lieutenant Colonel L.G. Woolwrap, Commanding Officer
 Sean Tucker as Corporal Lavone, Rudy's Friend and Astute Scrounger
 Michael Ironside as Guy X, Wounded Vietnam Veteran

Awards

References

External links
 

Films set in Greenland
2005 comedy-drama films
2005 films
Films scored by Hilmar Örn Hilmarsson
2005 comedy films
2005 drama films
English-language Canadian films
English-language Icelandic films
2000s English-language films